Big Stone Wetland Management District is a protected area encompassing scattered wetlands in Lincoln and Lyon Counties, Minnesota, United States. It is operated by the U.S. Fish and Wildlife Service out of headquarters within Big Stone National Wildlife Refuge.  District staff also serve private land resource interests by providing technical assistance for United States Department of Agriculture programs and restoring wetlands on private lands.

The District is also responsible for managing several USFWS properties and easements that are part of the Northern Tallgrass Prairie National Wildlife Refuge. The area remains a critical waterfowl breeding and migration area and offers potential for many resource protection/enhancement projects within several watersheds that empty into the Minnesota River.

References

External links
Big Stone Wetland Management District

National Wildlife Refuges in Minnesota
Protected areas of Lincoln County, Minnesota
Protected areas of Lyon County, Minnesota
Wetlands of Minnesota
Landforms of Lincoln County, Minnesota
Landforms of Lyon County, Minnesota